HMS Sheerness was a fifth rate built under the 1689 programme built at Sheerness Dockyard. Her guns were listed under old terms for guns as demi-culverines, sakers and minions. After commissioning she spent her career in Home Waters, North America, Mediterranean and the West Indies. She was reduced to a 20-gun sixth rate in 1717 then rebuilt as a Modified 1719 Establishment sixth rate in 1731. She was sold in 1744.

Sheerness was the second named vessel since it was used for a2-gun smack built at Chatham in 1673 and sunk 24 April 1695 as a foundation at Sheerness.

Construction
She was ordered on 28 June 1689 from Chatham Dockyard to be built under the guidance of Master Shipwright Daniel Furzer. She was launched on 6 March 1691.

Commissioned Service
HMS Sheerness was commissioned in 1691 under the command of Captain Anthony Roope, RN for service in the North Sea. With the death of Captain Roope on 25 June 1692 Captain Thomas Fowlis took over. January 1693 saw Captain John Norris, RN in command with the Smyrna convoy in June 1693. September 1693 she was under Captain Lord Archibald Hamilton, RN. In 1694 she temporarily under the command of Captain James Lawrence. Captain Valentine Bowles, RN was in command for service in the West Indies in 1697. Captain Bowles was dismissed by court-martial on 27 October 1698. Captain William Urry, RN was in command in 1701. she was off Dunkirk in 1702 then went to the Orkney Islands with Beaumont's squadron then was with Shovel's Fleet in October. In 1703 Captain Thomas Mitchell, RN was in command for service in Newfoundland in 1703. She then proceeded to the Leeward Islands in 1704 followed by the North Sea in 1705.

In 1706 she was under the command of Captain William Bloys, RN for service in the Leeward Islands. She took the privateer, La Trompeuse on 27 June 1709. She spent 1709–10 in the North Sea with service at the Firth of Forth in 1712. She underwent a great repair at Sheerness between November 1712 and February 1713 at a cost of £928.11.0 1/2d. She spent 1713 'owling'. She paid off at Portsmouth in December 1714. She was reduced to a 20-gun sixth rate by Admiralty Order (AO) 23 February 1717 at a cost of £4,387.9.51/4d from February to August 1717.

Commissioned Service as a Sixth Rate
She recommissioned under Captain Arthur Delgarno, RN for service at Sale, Morocco in 1718. She under went a great repair at Deptford for £1,082.4.9d between April and October 1722. This repaired her head that was damaged by a collier at Woolwich. In April 1724 her commander was Captain James Cornwall, RN for service in New England. She was surveyed in 1729 then docked at Deptford on 7 March 1730 for dismantling and preparation for rebuilding.

Rebuild to Modified 1719 Establishment Sixth Rate 1731
She was ordered to be rebuilt on 116 December 1729 at Deptford Dockyard under the guidance of Master Shipwright Richard Stacey. Her keel was laid in December 1730 and launched on 4 January 1732. The tonnage calculation would be 42813/94 tons. The gun armament as established in 1713 would be twenty 6-pounder 19 hundredweight (cwt) guns mounted on wooden trucks. She was completed for sea 11 February 1732 at a cost of £6,026

Commissioned Service After 1731 Rebuild
She was commissioned in January 1732 under the command of Captain Robert Fytche, RN for service at Newfoundland and moved to the Mediterranean in 1733. In 1734 she was under the command of Captain Miles Stapleton, RN for service in the West Indies. She took the Nuestra Senora del Rosario off Cartegena in December 1739. In May 1741 under Captain Robert Maynard, RN she partook in Santiago operations from July to October 1741. In 1742 under Captain Henry Ward, RN returned Home in September 1742.

Disposition
She was sold by AO 23 May 1744 for £240 on 5 June 1744.

Notes

Citations

References
 Winfield 2009, British Warships in the Age of Sail (1603 – 1714), by Rif Winfield, published by Seaforth Publishing, England © 2009, EPUB , Chapter 5, The Fifth Rates, Vessels acquired from 16 December 1688, Fifth Rates of 32 and 36 guns, 1689 Programme, Sheerness
 Winfield 2007, British Warships in the Age of Sail (1714 – 1792), by Rif Winfield, published by Seaforth Publishing, England © 2007, EPUB , Chapter 6, Sixth Rates, Sixth Rates of 20 or 24 guns, Vessels acquired from 1 August 1714, Modified 1719 Establishment Group, Sheerness
 Colledge, Ships of the Royal Navy, by J.J. Colledge, revised and updated by Lt Cdr Ben Warlow and Steve Bush, published by Seaforth Publishing, Barnsley, Great Britain, © 2020, EPUB , Section S (Sheerness)

 

Frigates of the Royal Navy
Ships built in Sheerness
Ships of the Royal Navy
1690s ships